Ryan Aguilar (born September 11, 1994) is an American professional baseball outfielder in the Los Angeles Angels organization. After playing college baseball for the University of Arizona, he was drafted by the Milwaukee Brewers in the 31st round of the 2016 MLB draft. He made his MLB debut in 2022 with the Angels.

Early life
Aguilar was born in Yorba Linda, California on September 11, 1994. He grew up in the Orange County region and frequently went to Angels games, meeting Reggie Jackson during the 2002 American League Division Series. He attended Esperanza High School in Anaheim, California. After high school, Aguilar played his first two seasons of college baseball at Santa Ana College, where he was named to the All-Orange Empire Conference team as a sophomore. Aguilar transferred to the University of Arizona and joined the baseball team for the 2015 season. He posted a .190 batting average in 26 games in his first season with the Wildcats. In 2016, he batted .310 with 8 home runs, 56 runs batted in (RBI), and a .879 on-base plus slugging (OPS) in 73 games, all of which he started.  He graduated from Arizona with a bachelor's degree in general studies, sports and society emphasis.

Professional career

Milwaukee Brewers organization
Aguilar was drafted by the Milwaukee Brewers in the 31st round of the 2016 MLB draft. He was initially assigned to the Arizona League Brewers, where he batted .278 in 5 games. He was promoted to the Helena Brewers of the Pioneer League for the remainder of 2016, batting .248 with 11 doubles and a .735 OPS in 40 games. Aguilar spent the 2017 season with the Class A Wisconsin Timber Rattlers of the Midwest League and batted .206 with 23 RBI in 105 games. In 2018, he was promoted to the Class A-Advanced Carolina Mudcats of the Carolina League, batting .223 with 21 doubles and 56 RBI in 126 games. Aguilar spent most of 2019 with the Mudcats and batted .272 with 22 doubles and 47 RBI in 105 games and was then promoted to the Double-A Biloxi Shuckers of the Southern League, where batted .236 in 24 games. He did not play in any professional games in 2020 due to the minor league season being cancelled. In 2021, Aguilar returned to Biloxi and posted a career-worst .146 batting average in 74 games. On August 16, the Brewers organization released Aguilar. He later said he thought his career was over when he was released by the team.

Los Angeles Angels
Aguilar signed a minor league contract with the Los Angeles Angels on December 15, 2021, and was assigned to the Double-A Rocket City Trash Pandas of the Southern League. In 88 games with Rocket City, he batted .280 with 15 home runs, 13 doubles, 48 RBI, and a .944 OPS.

On August 26, 2022, Aguilar had his contract selected by the Angels and made his debut against the Toronto Blue Jays at Rogers Centre. He went 0-for-2 with two walks and two runs scored. On August 27, he recorded his first career hit with a double off Alek Manoah but was thrown out while attempting to go to third base. On August 29, Aguilar was returned to Rocket City and promoted him to the Triple-A Salt Lake Bees of the Pacific Coast League the next day. On September 1, he was called back up to the major leagues. Aguilar was designated for assignment on September 9, outrighted to Salt Lake on September 11, and assigned to Rocket City on September 13. Aguilar finished his cup of coffee season batting .136 with two RBIs in seven games.

Personal life
Aguilar's older brother, Shane, played college baseball for Cypress College in Cypress, California.

References

External links

1994 births
Living people
Arizona League Brewers players
Arizona Wildcats baseball players
Baseball players from California
Biloxi Shuckers players
Carolina Mudcats players
Helena Brewers players
Los Angeles Angels players
Major League Baseball outfielders
People from Yorba Linda, California
Rocket City Trash Pandas players
Salt Lake Bees players
Santa Ana Dons baseball players
Wisconsin Timber Rattlers players